"Rebel Beat" is a song recorded by American alternative rock band the Goo Goo Dolls from their tenth studio album titled Magnetic. "Rebel Beat" was premiered on several US radio stations on January 18, 2013. The song was officially released on February 19, 2013.

Meaning
In an interview with Billboard.com, Rzeznik explains Rebel Beat is a collaboration with Gregg Wattenberg, built from a rhythm idea. "I was playing this great old guitar that had kind of a (Led) Zeppelin tone to it," Rzeznik recalls. "I started playing this real sort of basic kind of riff, and we just went from there and then started burbling out lyrics." The final lyrics, Rzeznik says, were inspired by being in New York and walking around the Little Italy and Chinatown districts. "They had this street closed off and a huge party going on," he remembers. "I was thinking, 'I love this! I want to be part of this!' So basically it turned out to be a song about celebrating everything and (saying) no matter what, you've got to have fun. That's really it."

Music video
On the day of the release, the band posted a video on the band's YouTube page. On January 29, Warner Bros Records released an official lyric video.
On March 6, the webpage VideoStatic, announced the start of the production of a music video for the song. It also stated that the video will be directed by P.R. Brown.

Track listing
Digital single
"Rebel Beat" - 3:34

Chart performance

Weekly charts

Year-end charts

References

2013 singles
Goo Goo Dolls songs
Songs written by John Rzeznik
Songs written by Gregg Wattenberg
2013 songs